Douglas Adolph Mikolas (born June 7, 1961) is a former American football nose tackle who played two seasons in the National Football League with the San Francisco 49ers and Houston Oilers. Mikolas played college football at Portland state and attended Scio High School in Scio, Oregon. He was also a member of the Denver Gold of the United States Football League, Toronto Argonauts of the Canadian Football League and the New York/New Jersey Knights of the World League of American Football. He was a member of the San Francisco 49ers team that won Super Bowl XXIII.

External links
Just Sports Stats
Fanbase profile

Living people
1961 births
Players of American football from California
American football defensive linemen
Canadian football defensive linemen
American players of Canadian football
Oregon Tech Hustlin' Owls football players
Denver Gold players
Toronto Argonauts players
San Francisco 49ers players
Houston Oilers players
New York/New Jersey Knights players
People from Manteca, California
People from Linn County, Oregon
National Football League replacement players